Qarah Hajji, also known as Qarah Hajjilu, may refer to:
 Qarah Hajji-ye Olya
 Qarah Hajji-ye Sofla